György Bernády (Bethlen, 10 April 1864 – Târgu Mureș, 22 October 1938) was the mayor of Târgu Mureș (Marosvásárhely) twice, 1900–1912 and 1926–1929. In this period the City Hall and the Cultural Palace in Târgu Mureș on the Roses Square were both built. His name is associated with public illumination and sewerage in the city. In this period many schools, libraries and art galleries were also built.

Biography
He was born to Hungarian parents. His father, Dániel Bernády was an apothecary.

György Bernády studied in Marosvásárhely and Budapest. He had a daughter, Györgyike, born in 1919 in his fourth marriage, but he lost her very quickly, after 17 years.

Bernády's statue is located in front of the Teleki house, in a place named after him. The statue's creator is Vince Bocskay, from Sovata.

Modernization
Bernády was the first initiator of the town modernization. He had many goals such as sewerage, roads asphalting, building of the power and water station, building of several bridges, regularization of the Mureș stream and building of public buildings such as the City Hall, the Cultural Palace in Târgu Mureș.
He founded and settled the Academy of Music, the Municipal Library and the Art Galleries.

There were constructed several buildings to host primary, secondary schools and universities.

Works
 "Az erdélyrészi földgáz kérdésről" (Questions about Transylvanian natural gas) (Târgu Mureş, 1913)
 "Intelmek" (Remonstrances) (Târgu Mureş, 1916)
 "Nyílt levél" (Open letter) (Târgu Mureş, 1920)

Bibliography
 A. Todea, F. Maria, M. Avram, Oameni de știință mureșeni - Dicționar biobibliografic, CJ Mureș Biblioteca Județeană Mureș, tipografia Mediaprint SRL, 2004

External links 
https://web.archive.org/web/20150711205531/http://www.voceatransilvaniei.ro/cum-a-ajuns-targu-mures-de-la-un-targ-de-provincie-un-oras-elitist-povestea-incepe-in-urma-cu-111-ani/
 https://web.archive.org/web/20071013010200/http://www.mures.ro/article.php/The-history-of-Tirgu-Mures/113/

1864 births
1938 deaths
19th-century Hungarian people
20th-century Hungarian people
20th-century Romanian people
Mayors of places in Romania
People from Târgu Mureș
Romanian politicians of Hungarian descent
Hungarian Calvinist and Reformed Christians
Romanian Calvinist and Reformed Christians
People from Beclean
20th-century Romanian politicians